Holyhead Lifeboat Station is a Royal National Lifeboat Institution (RNLI) lifeboat station in the coastal town of Holyhead, Anglesey, Wales. It is one of the three oldest lifeboat stations situated on the North Wales coast, a disused building of which houses the Holyhead Maritime Museum.

History

Holyhead Lifeboat Station was first mentioned in 1825 when it was decided a lifeboat would be built for the coastal town of Holyhead. A local committee was formed three years later and the first lifeboat arrived at the station shortly afterwards. The Royal National Lifeboat Institution (RNLI) took over control of the station in 1855 and an lifeboat house was built three years later. The station covered the shipping lane in and out of Liverpool. In 1890 Holyhead Lifeboat Station received its first steam lifeboat, which was one of six to serve in the RNLI. The lifeboat was involved in an operation to rescue crewmembers of the SS Harold in 1908 which anchored near rocks between North Stack and South Stack. It was retired in 1928 when it was replaced by a motor-powered lifeboat and twenty-one years later a new boathouse and slipway were constructed on Salt Island.
The boathouse and slipway were used until 1980, when a new Arun-class boat was allocated to the station and kept afloat in the harbour. Unfortunately, wash from the ferry traffic led to the boat's GRP hull being damaged, and as a temporary measure a steel-hulled Waveney-class boat was placed on station while the boathouse and slipway were reconditioned and a new Tyne-class boat was constructed for the station. The new boat entered service in 1985, and slipway launching continued until 1997 when a new, more protected, berth was found for
an Arun-class boat to take over, to be replaced in 2003 by the present Severn class.

An inshore lifeboat station was established on the site in 1967. The boathouse was expanded in 1987 to fit a D-class lifeboat (EA16) and its launching trolley. Its current inshore boat, the D-791 Mary & Archie Hooper, entered service in 2016; the current all-weather boat that serves the station, the  ON 1272 Christopher Pearce, was first used in 2003. Lead was stolen from the station's roof in the morning of 16 June 2011. In February 2015 the station appointed its first female helm.

Fleet

All Weather Boats

Inshore lifeboats

References

External links
 

Lifeboat stations in Wales
1828 establishments in Wales
Buildings and structures in Anglesey
Holyhead